Democracy Day may refer to:
 International Day of Democracy, since 2007 the United Nations General Assembly decided to observe 15 September as the International Day of Democracy
 Democracy Day (Canada), project launched by Fair Vote Canada to "celebrate and reflect upon Canadian democracy"
 Democracy Day (Cape Verde), an annual public holiday in Cape Verde
 Democracy Day (Nigeria), May 29, for the return of democracy in Nigeria in 1999
 Democracy Day (United Kingdom), a day of events to mark the 750th anniversary of the first Parliament to include representatives of the people
 Democracy Day (United States), a proposed federal holiday corresponding to Election Day on even-numbered years

See also
 Parliament Week (United Kingdom)